Slope Road is a Canadian unincorporated community in Northfield Parish, Sunbury County, New Brunswick.

It is located 3 kilometres northwest of Minto, and near New England Settlement.  The community of Sloap Road should not be confused with the street Slope Rd which runs between Slope Road and Minto.

History

Notable people

See also
List of communities in New Brunswick

References

Communities in Sunbury County, New Brunswick